Termessa laeta is a moth in the subfamily Arctiinae. It was described by Francis Walker in 1856. It is found in Australia, where it has been recorded from the Australian Capital Territory, New South Wales, Queensland, South Australia, Victoria and Western Australia.

References

Moths described in 1856
Lithosiini